Frank Keller is a professor of computational cognition at the School of Informatics, University of Edinburgh and director at the Institute for Language, Cognition and Computation.

Keller got his B.S. from the University of Stuttgart and then got his Ph.D. from the University of Edinburgh. He then served as postdoc at Saarland University and Massachusetts Institute of Technology, before managing European Network on Vision and Language Committee and serving as a member of the European Association for Computational Linguistics' governing board.

References

External links

20th-century births
Living people
German computer scientists
University of Stuttgart alumni
Alumni of the University of Edinburgh
Academics of the University of Edinburgh
Year of birth missing (living people)
Place of birth missing (living people)